Gelert, also spelled Gellert or Killhart, was a 13th-century dog of Welsh fable

Gelert may also refer to:

 Gelert (company), a company selling outdoor equipment
 Elżbieta Gelert (born 1955), Polish politician
 Otto Gelert (1862-1899), Danish botanist and pharmacist
 Saint Gelert (7th century), probable founder of Beddgelert and Llangeler, in Wales
 Gelert's Farm Works, British railway operating center
 Gelert's Farm halt, British railway platform
 Gelert, a type of pet in Neopets

See also
Gellert (disambiguation)